The  2018–19 season was the 10th season of competitive football by Viitorul Constanța, and the 7th consecutive in the Liga I. Viitorul Constanța competed in the Liga I, Cupa României and Europa League. The club won their first Romanian Cup on 25 May 2019, defeating Astra Giurgiu in the final.

Season overview

Background

Previous season positions

Players

Squad information

First-team squad

Transfers

In:

 

Out:

Preseason and friendlies

Competitions

Liga I

The Liga I fixture list was announced on 5 July 2018.

Regular season

Table

Matches

Championship round

Table

Position by round

Matches

Cupa României

Round of 32

Round of 16

Quarter-finals

Semi-finals

Final

UEFA Europa League

After finishing fourth in the 2017-18 Liga I, Viitorul Constanța entered the Europa League at the first qualifying round.

First qualifying round

Second qualifying round

Statistics

Goalscorers

Clean sheets

Disciplinary record

Most yellow cards:
 Sebastian Mladen(11 cards)
Most red cards:
 Tudor Băluță(2 cards)

UEFA Club rankings

See also

 2018–19 Cupa României
 2018–19 Liga I
 2018–19 UEFA Europa League

Notes

References

FC Viitorul Constanța seasons
Viitorul, Viitorul Constanța
Viitorul Constanța